Pat Dalton (6 September 1918 – 15 September 2011) was an Australian rules footballer who played with Collingwood and North Melbourne in the Victorian Football League (VFL).

Dalton was transferred to Shepparton as a Policeman with the Victorian Police in 1947 and was cleared from Heidelberg to East Shepparton.

Dalton later coached Shepparton East in the Central Goulburn Valley Football League in 1948 (to a premiership)  and 1949 (last).

Dalton was runner up in the Central Goulburn Valley Football League best and fairest award in both 1948  and 1949.

Dalton coached the newly formed City United in the Goulburn Valley Football League in 1950 (runners up) and 1951 (3rd).

Notes

External links 

Policeman - Pat Dalton

2011 deaths
1918 births
Australian rules footballers from Victoria (Australia)
Collingwood Football Club players
North Melbourne Football Club players
Ivanhoe Amateurs Football Club players